Wivenhoe Pocket is a rural locality in the Somerset Region, Queensland, Australia.

History
Wivenhoe Pocket was named after an early pastoral run managed by Edmund Blucher Uhr, who named it after the town of Wivenhoe in Essex, England.

In 1877,  were resumed from the Wivenhoe pastoral run and offered for selection on 19 April 1877.

References

External links

Suburbs of Somerset Region
Localities in Queensland